Always Goodbye is the title of two American films:

Always Goodbye (1931 film), a drama starring Elissa Landi, Lewis Stone and Paul Cavanagh
Always Goodbye (1938 film), a romantic drama starring Barbara Stanwyck, Herbert Marshall and Ian Hunter